Bashlan Beshlu (also Romanized as Bāshlān Beshlū; also known as Bāshlā Nabeshlū, Bāshlān Būshlū, and Qarchālār) is a village in Nazlu-e Shomali Rural District, Nazlu District, Urmia County, West Azerbaijan Province, Iran. At the 2006 census, its population was 634, in 174 families.

References 

Populated places in Urmia County